Structure and Interpretation of Computer Programs (SICP) is a computer science textbook by Massachusetts Institute of Technology professors Harold Abelson and Gerald Jay Sussman with Julie Sussman. It is known as the "Wizard Book" in hacker culture. It teaches fundamental principles of computer programming, including recursion, abstraction, modularity, and programming language design and implementation.

MIT Press published the first edition in 1984, and the second edition in 1996. It was formerly used as the textbook for MIT's introductory course in computer science. SICP focuses on discovering general patterns for solving specific problems, and building software systems that make use of those patterns.

MIT Press published the JavaScript edition in 2022.

Content 
The book describes computer science concepts using Scheme, a dialect of Lisp. It also uses a virtual register machine and assembler to implement Lisp interpreters and compilers.

Characters 
Several fictional characters appear in the book:
 Alyssa P. Hacker, a Lisp hacker
 Ben Bitdiddle
 Cy D. Fect, a "reformed C programmer"
 Eva Lu Ator
 Lem E. Tweakit
 Louis Reasoner, a loose reasoner

License 
The book is licensed under a Creative Commons Attribution-ShareAlike 4.0 International (CC BY-SA 4.0) license.

Coursework 
The book was used as the textbook for MIT's former introductory programming course, 6.001, from fall 1984 through its last semester, in fall 2007. Other schools also made use of the book as a course textbook.
Various versions of the JavaScript edition have been used by the National University of Singapore since 2012 in the course CS1101S.

Reception 
Byte recommended SICP "for professional programmers who are really interested in their profession". The magazine said that the book was not easy to read, but that it would expose experienced programmers to both old and new topics.

Influence 
SICP has been influential in computer science education, and several later books have been inspired by its style.
 Structure and Interpretation of Classical Mechanics (SICM), another book that uses Scheme as an instructional element, by Gerald Jay Sussman and Jack Wisdom
 Software Design for Flexibility, by Chris Hanson and Gerald Jay Sussman
 How to Design Programs (HtDP), which intends to be a more accessible book for introductory Computer Science, and to address perceived incongruities in SICP
 Essentials of Programming Languages (EoPL), a book for Programming Languages courses

See also 
 Structure and Interpretation of Computer Programs, JavaScript Edition
 Compilers: Principles, Techniques, and Tools - Also known as The Dragon Book

References

External links 
 
 Video lectures
 Book compiled from TeX source
 Structure and Interpretation of Computer Programs. Interactive Version

1984 non-fiction books
1996 non-fiction books
Computer science books
Computer programming books
Creative Commons-licensed books
Massachusetts Institute of Technology
Scheme (programming language)
Lisp (programming language)